1st Pioneer Battalion may refer to:

 1st Pioneer Battalion (Australia): a unit of the Australian Army that served during the First World War
 2/1st Pioneer Battalion (Australia): a unit of the Australian Army that served during the Second World War 
 1st Combat Engineer Battalion: a United States Marine Corps unit, which was originally designated as the 1st Pioneer Battalion